Casey Sherriff (born 22 April 1998) is an Australian rules footballer playing for the Melbourne Football Club in the AFL Women's (AFLW). Sherriff was recruited by Melbourne in September 2018 as a replacement for Melbourne captain, Daisy Pearce, who missed the 2019 season through pregnancy. She made her debut against  at Casey Fields in the opening round of the 2020 season.

References

External links 

1998 births
Living people
Melbourne Football Club (AFLW) players
Australian rules footballers from Victoria (Australia)